Mary of Egypt (c. 344 – c. 421) is an Egyptian saint, highly venerated as a Desert Mother in the Eastern Orthodox and Coptic Churches. The Catholic Church commemorates her as a patron saint of penitents.

Life

The primary source of information on Saint Mary of Egypt is the Vita written of her by Saint Sophronius, Patriarch of Jerusalem (634–638). Most of the information in this section is taken from this source.

Saint Mary of Egypt, also known as Maria Aegyptiaca, was born somewhere in the Province of Egypt, and at the age of twelve ran away from her parents to the city of Alexandria. There, she lived an extremely dissolute life. In her Vita it states that she often refused the money offered for her sexual favors, as she was driven "by an insatiable and an irrepressible passion", and that she mainly lived by begging, supplemented by spinning flax.

After seventeen years of this lifestyle, she traveled to Jerusalem for the Great Feasts of the Exaltation of the Holy Cross. She undertook the journey as a sort of "anti-pilgrimage", stating that she hoped to find in the pilgrim crowds at Jerusalem even more partners to sate her lust. She paid for her passage by offering sexual favors to other pilgrims, and she briefly continued her habitual lifestyle in Jerusalem. Her Vita relates that when she tried to enter the Church of the Holy Sepulchre for the celebrations, she was barred by an unseen force. Realizing this was because of her impurity, she was struck with remorse, and upon seeing an icon of the Theotokos (the Virgin Mary) outside the church, she prayed for forgiveness and promised to give up the world (i.e., become an ascetic). She attempted again to enter the church, and this time was able to go in. After venerating the relic of the True Cross, she returned to the icon to give thanks, and heard a voice telling her, "If you cross the Jordan, you will find glorious rest." She immediately went to the monastery of Saint John the Baptist on the banks of the River Jordan, where she received absolution and afterwards Holy Communion. The next morning, she crossed the Jordan eastwards and retired to the desert to live the rest of her life as a hermit in penitence. She took with her only three loaves of bread she had bought, and once she had eaten these, lived only on what she could find in the wilderness.

Approximately one year before her death, she recounted her life to Saint Zosimas of Palestine, who encountered her in the desert. When he unexpectedly met her in the desert, she was completely naked and almost unrecognizable as human. She asked Zosimas to toss her his mantle to cover herself with, and then she narrated her life's story to him. She asked him to meet her at the banks of the Jordan on Holy Thursday of the following year, and to bring her Holy Communion. When he fulfilled her wish, she crossed the river to get to him by walking on the water, and received Holy Communion, telling him to meet her again in the desert the following Lent. 

The next year, Zosimas went to the same spot where he first met her, some twenty days' journey from his monastery. There, he found her lying dead; an inscription written in the sand next to her head stated that she had died the very night he had given her Communion, her incorrupt body miraculously transported to that spot. He buried her body with the assistance of a passing lion. On returning to his monastery, he related her life story to the other brethren, and it was preserved among them as oral tradition until it was written down by Saint Sophronius.

Date of death
There is disagreement among various sources regarding the dates of Saint Mary's life. Some scholars doubt her existence, on the grounds of the similarity of her Vita to the stories of other "desert mothers": "[I]t is impossible to provide a chronology for the life of Mary, or even to establish her historicity." The dates given above correspond to those in the Catholic Encyclopedia. The Bollandists place her death in 421, or 530 (see Prolog from Ohrid, 1 April). The only clue given in her Vita is the fact that the day of her repose was 1 April, which is stated to be Holy Thursday, meaning that Easter fell on 4 April that year.

Religious commemoration

In iconography, Saint Mary of Egypt is depicted as a deeply tanned, emaciated old woman with unkempt gray hair, either naked or covered by the mantle she borrowed from Zosimas. She is often shown with the three loaves of bread she bought before her final journey into the desert.

Her feast day is kept by the Orthodox according to the Fixed Cycle on 1 April. In the Moveable Cycle, the Orthodox Church also commemorates her on the fifth Sunday of Great Lent, on which day it is customary for the priest to bless dried fruit after the Divine Liturgy. The Life of St Mary, by Saint Sophronius, is appointed to be read during the Matins of the Great Canon of Saint Andrew of Crete on the preceding Thursday, which is accompanied with a Canon to her and St Andrew sung after each Ode of the Great Canon itself.

In the Catholic Church, she is listed in the 2004 edition of the Roman Martyrology on 1 April. She is venerated by Anglicans and appears on the Episcopal Church liturgical calendar. In Italy, she became associated with the patronage of "fallen women" much like Mary Magdalene, to whom similar traits were associated.

Churches 
There are a number of churches and chapels dedicated to Saint Mary of Egypt, among them:
Temple of Portunus (Santa Maria Egiziaca, Rome)
Church of Santa Maria Egiziaca a Forcella, Naples
Church of Santa Maria Egiziaca a Pizzofalcone, Naples
Chapel in Church of the Holy Sepulchre in Jerusalem, commemorating the site of her conversion.

Rosa Egipcíaca 
Rosa Egipcíaca, an Afro-Brazilian religious mystic and formerly enslaved prostitute, renamed herself in 1798 to honour Saint Mary of Egypt. Egipcíaca was the first black woman in Brazil to write a book, Sagrada Teologia do Amor Divino das Almas Peregrinas ("Holy Theology of Divine Love of the Pilgrim Souls"), that recorded her religious visions.

Cultural references

In Goethe's Faust, Mary of Egypt is one of the three penitent saints who pray to the Virgin Mary for forgiveness for Faust. Her words are set by Mahler in his 8th Symphony, as the final saint's appeal to the Mater Gloriosa.

In Ben Jonson's play Volpone (1606) one of the characters uses the expression "Marry Gip". Commentators have taken this to mean "Mary of Egypt".

Mary of Egypt is the subject of operas by Ottorino Respighi (Maria egiziaca), John Craton (Saint Mary of Egypt), and Sir John Tavener (Mary of Egypt). The Tavener opera was written in 1992 for the Aldeburgh Festival.

The Unknown Masterpiece (1831), a novella by Balzac, contains a long description of a portrait of Mary of Egypt "undressing in order to pay her passage to Jerusalem".

Nalo Hopkinson's science fiction novel, The Salt Roads, also features Mary of Egypt and takes a historical fiction approach to telling her story.

In John Berryman's Pulitzer Prize winning book of poetry, The Dream Songs, poem 47, subtitled "April Fool's Day, or, St. Mary of Egypt", recounts Mary of Egypt's walk across the River Jordan.

"Thrust back by hands of air from the sanctuary door" is the first line of Maria Aegyptiaca, a poem by John Heath-Stubbs about the saint (Collected Poems, p. 289).

See also 
 Desert Mothers
 Syncletica of Alexandria
 Saint Mary of Egypt, patron saint archive
 Sarah of the Desert

Notes

Further reading

External links

Original Vita of Saint Mary of Egypt by Saint Sophronius, as read in Orthodox churches on Thursday of the fifth week of Great Lent
Original Vita of Saint Mary of Egypt by Saint Sophronius, as read in Orthodox churches on Thursday of the fifth week of Great Lent
Saint Mary the Egyptian from the Prologue from Ohrid, April 1
The Golden Legend: The Life of Saint Mary of Egypt (In Persian, with English translation)
Fifth Sunday of Great Lent: Saint Mary of Egypt icon and synaxarion
"St. Mary of Egypt: Ascent From Prostitution to Sanctity" from Harlots of the Desert, by Sr. Benedicta Ward
Her story in 7 stained glass scenes from Auxerre Cathedral

344 births
421 deaths
Saints from Roman Egypt
Egyptian hermits
Miracle workers
4th-century Christian saints
4th-century Byzantine women
5th-century Byzantine women
Late Ancient Christian female saints